Flossie may refer to:
 Flossie, a Venus of Fifteen, an 1897 English erotic novel
 Tropical Storm Flossie (disambiguation)

People with the given name Flossie

 Flossie Page (1893–2006), American supercentenarian
 Flossie Wong-Staal (1947–2020), Chinese-American virologist and molecular biologist

See also
 Floss (disambiguation)
 Flossy